The 1936 Gent–Wevelgem was the third edition of the Gent–Wevelgem cycle race and was held on 28 May 1936. The race started in Ghent and finished in Wevelgem. The race was won by Robert Van Eenaeme.

General classification

References

Gent–Wevelgem
1936 in road cycling
1936 in Belgian sport
May 1936 sports events